Alexeyevka is a rural locality (a selo) in Pavlovsky Selsoviet, Uglovsky District, Altai Krai, Russia. The population was 176 as of 2013. It was founded in 1908. There are 5 streets.

Geography 
Alexeyevka is located 39 km west of Uglovskoye (the district's administrative centre) by road. Pavlovka is the nearest rural locality.

References 

Rural localities in Uglovsky District, Altai Krai